Gee's golden langur (Trachypithecus geei), also known as simply the golden langur, is an Old World monkey found in a small region of Western Assam, India and in the neighboring foothills of the Black Mountains of Bhutan. Long considered sacred by many Himalayan people, the golden langur was first brought to the attention of the Western world by the naturalist Edward Pritchard Gee in the 1950s. Adult males have a cream to golden coat with darker flanks while the females and juveniles are lighter. It lives in high trees and has a herbivorous diet of fruits, leaves, seeds, buds and flowers. The average group size is eight individuals, with a ratio of several females to each adult male. It is one of the most endangered primate species of India and Bhutan.

Discovery and etymology 
The earliest record of the golden langur is in an 1838 paper by Robert Boileau Pemberton which states that "Griffith observed these monkeys near Tongso in Central Bhutan." However, since Pemberton's work was lost and not rediscovered until the 1970s, the scientific discovery of the golden langur unfolded differently. In 1907, Edward Oswald Shebbeare—who was out with some hunters and forest rangers—reported seeing a "cream coloured langur" in the vicinity of the Jamduar. However, neither a photograph nor a live or dead specimen was presented at that time.  The first reference to the golden langur in print, as an animal of unidentified taxonomic status, was in a 1919 publication that stated: "Pithecus sp? – A pale yellow coloured langur is common in the adjoining district of Goalpara (Assam). Jerdon reported one from Terai, the adjacent district on the (west) side, which Blanford suggested might be P. entellus."

In February 1947, in the Forest Rest House visitors' book in Raimona, a few miles south of Jamduar, C. G. Baron reported seeing some langurs whose "whole body and tail is one colour – a light silvery-gold, somewhat like the hair of a blonde."  A year later, back in Jamduar, H. E. Tyndale, a tea planter, reported seeing "Sankosh cream langurs." However, it wasn't until a few years later that a focused effort to identify the golden langur was mounted by Gee, who traveled back to Jamduar in November 1953.  His team were able to observe three groups of golden langurs, all on the east bank of the Sankosh river.  The first group was observed on the Bhutan side of the border; the second group, a large one of 30 to 40 individuals, a mile north of Jamduar on the Indian side; and a third group four to five miles (6.44 km to 8.05 km) south near Raimona.  Colour movies of the second group were made by Gee.

In August 1954, Gee reported his findings to an expert at the Zoological Society of London, who advised that the golden langur might be a new species.  In January 1955, Gee also reported his results to the Zoological Survey of India (ZSI) and, after showing his movies of the golden langurs, suggested that Jamduar be included in the then-upcoming ZSI-survey of that region.  The suggestion received the support of Dr. Sunder Lal Hora, then Director of ZSI, and later that year six specimens of the golden langur were collected by the survey party.  The following year, Dr. H. Khajuria, a taxonomist who studied the specimens, described the new species naming it Presbystis geei in honour of Gee.

Taxonomy 
There are two subspecies of this species:
 Trachypithecus geei geei Khajuria, 1956
 Trachypithecus geei bhutanensis Wangchuk, 2003

The subspecies are separated by a geological fault in the Himalayas called the Main Frontal Thrust. T. g. bhutanensis occurs in the northern part of the species range in Bhutan and T. g. geei is found in the south of Bhutan and in Assam in northern India.

In Bhutan, it has hybridised with T. pileatus, the capped langur. This is believed to be due to the construction of permanent bridges across the Chamkar river, a tributary of the Mangde river which separates the two species.

Physical description 

The coat of the adult golden langur ranges from cream to golden, on its flanks and chest the hairs are darker and often rust coloured while the coats of the juveniles and females are lighter, silvery white to light buff. The coat changes color seasonally, from white or cream coloured in the summer to dark golden or chestnut in the winter. Their long whiskers protect their eyes from rain during monsoon. The golden langur has a black face and large whorl of hair on its crown. 

Gee's golden langur exhibits sexual dimorphism. Males are larger and more robust than females. Adult males weigh  on average and adult females weigh . 

Distribution 
These biogeographical barriers are believed to have led to the radiation of species from the closely-related capped langur (Trachypithecus pileatus). In 1988, two captive groups of Gee's golden langur were released into the wild in Tripura state in north-eastern India, an area outside of their natural range. One of the groups, released into Sepahijala Wildlife Sanctuary, survives and has adapted to the wild.

Behavior and ecology 
For the most part, the langur is confined to high trees where its long tail serves as a balancer when it leaps across branches. During the rainy season it obtains water from dew and rain drenched leaves. Its diet is herbivorous, consisting of ripe and unripe fruits, mature and young leaves, seeds, buds and flowers.
It generally lives in troops of about 8, with a ratio of several females to each adult male. The smallest golden langur troop was composed of four individuals, while the largest had 22, giving an average value of 8.2 individuals per troop. The adult gender ratio was 2.3 females to every male, although the majority of groups had only one adult male.

Conservation 
Gee's golden langur is currently endangered with a decreasing population trend; the total population of mature adults has been estimated as 6000–6500. It is one of the most endangered primate species of India and Bhutan. In India 93% of the population is found in forest reserves (Chirang, Manas and Ripu) and the western part of Manas National Park, and the remaining occur in several small isolated fragments. The population has declined by more than 30% in the last 30 years, and is expected to decline further in the near future. 
Golden langurs are protected by law in their range. The species is listed in Appendix I of CITES, and in Schedule I of both, the Wildlife Protection Act, 1972 of India, and the Forest and Nature Conservation Act of Bhutan, 1995.

Within India 
On 5 June 2019, the district authorities of Bongaigaon district in Assam launched a project under the MGNREGA to plant guava, mango, blackberry and other fruit trees to ensure that the resident golden langurs of the Kakoijana reserved forest do not have to risk their lives to find food. Several golden langurs have died due to electrocution and in road accidents while looking for food beyond the reserve forests.
In 1988, two captive groups of golden langurs were released into two protected areas of the western region of the state of Tripura, India.  As of 2000, one of these groups, consisting of six (and possibly eight) individuals in the Sepahijala Wildlife Sanctuary, had survived.
The relative death of infants and juveniles indicate a declining population with the habitat being degraded by human activity. A fragmented but protected population in a rubber plantation in the Nayakgaon, Kokrajhar, district of Assam increased in population from 38 individuals in 1997 to 52 in 2002. The population has also adapted to feeding on dry rubber seeds.

Notes

References

Literature cited

External links 

ARKive - images and movies of the golden langur (Trachypithecus geei)
 The Primata: Golden langur (Trachypithecus geei)
 Golden langur (Trachypithecus geei) video clips from the BBC archive

Gee's golden langur
Primates of South Asia
Mammals of Bhutan
Mammals of India
Fauna of Assam
Lower Assam
Monkeys in India
Gee's golden langur
Endangered fauna of Asia